The Genevieve Range is a low, small mountain range on western Nootka Island, which is on the western side of Nootka Sound, British Columbia, Canada. It consists of hills and has an area of 101 km2 and is a subrange of the Vancouver Island Ranges which in turn form part of the Insular Mountains.

See also
List of mountain ranges

References

External links

Vancouver Island Ranges